Dark Side of Comedy is a documentary series that premiered on VICE TV August 16, 2022.

Summary
Narrated by Dave Foley of Kids in the Hall fame, it features cautionary tales about the lives and/or deaths of popular stand up comedians.

Comedians profiled on series
Chris Farley
Andrew Dice Clay
Roseanne Barr
Richard Pryor
Artie Lange
Dustin Diamond
Freddie Prinze
Maria Bamford
Greg Giraldo
Brett Butler

People interviewed
Debra Wilson
Gilbert Godfried
Patton Oswalt
Marc Maron
Godfrey
Pete Holmes
Jim Gaffigan
Jimmy Walker
Tom Arnold
Yamaneika Saunders
Scott Thompson
Ron De Blasio
Kathy McKee
Cecil Brown
Josh Johnson
Ali Siddiq
Lisa Lampanelli
Orlando Jones
Dr. Deborah Serani
Mark Diamond
Dan Block

See also
Dark Side of the Ring
Dark Side of the 90's

References

External links
IMDb
Chris Farley episode on VICE's official YouTube channel

2022 American television series debuts
2020s American documentary television series
Viceland original programming
American television spin-offs